The Meckler-Allen airplane was an early biplane built by Allen Canton and John J. Meckler in 1912, for an attempt to make a transatlantic flight.  At the time of its first flight it was the largest airplane in the world.

History
In 1912, Allen Canton and John J. Meckler, two young Bronx electricians, built a  span hydro-biplane. The financing for the construction came from profits of their company Mechelectric  which held forty-five patents for new electrical devices. The partners planned to make the first transatlantic flight to Europe.

Specifications (Meckler-Allen Biplane)

References

1910s United States experimental aircraft
1912 in aviation